Events from the year 1850 in China.

Incumbents 
 Daoguang Emperor (30th year)
 Xianfeng Emperor (1st year)

Viceroys
 Viceroy of Zhili — Nergingge
 Viceroy of Min-Zhe 
 Liu Yunke
 Yutai
 Viceroy of Huguang 
 Yutai
 Viceroy of Shaan-Gan — Qishan 
 Viceroy of Liangguang — Xu Guangjin
 Viceroy of Yun-Gui 
 Cheng Yucai
 Wu Wenrong
 Viceroy of Sichuan — Xu Zechun

Events 
 9 March - Xianfeng Emperor succeed Daoguang Emperor as Emperor of the Qing dynasty
 Taiping Rebellion
 December 1850 - Hong Xiuquan defeats Qing forces sent to quell an uprising in Guangxi
 Admiral Amaral's head returned, after his assassination in 1849, by Edict of Viceroy

Ongoing
 Shen-kuang-szu Incident (1850–51)

Births 
 Qu Hongji (1850 －1918, Hunan), was a politician of the Chinese Qing Dynasty who served in several ministerial positions.

References